Hospital de Santa Maria  ("Saint Mary's Hospital") is a public Central Hospital serving the Greater Lisbon area as part of the Northern Lisbon University Hospital Centre (CHULN), a State-owned enterprise. Santa Maria is the largest hospital in Lisbon and indeed in Portugal.

History
Saint Mary's Hospital is located in the Cidade Universitária, the main campus of the University of Lisbon and ISCTE – University Institute of Lisbon, within the civil parish of Alvalade. Designed by German architect Hermann Distel, it was built from 1940 to 1953, meant as a new University Hospital housing the Faculty of Medicine of the University of Lisbon.

References

External links
 Official site

1953 establishments in Portugal
Hospitals in Lisbon
Hospitals established in 1953